The Eagle Classic was an annual golf tournament for professional women golfers on the Symetra Tour, the official developmental tour of the LPGA. The event was played from 2008 to 2014 in the Richmond, Virginia area.

In 2009 the title sponsor was iMPACT Ventures, a consulting firm based in Fairfax, Virginia. In 2010, the tournament was held without a title sponsor. In 2011, Eagle Companies signed a three-year contract to become the tournament's title sponsor. Eagle had previously been involved as the presenting sponsor of the tournament.

The last benefiting charity of the Eagle Classic was the Massey Cancer Center.

Tournament names through the years: 
2008:  Greater Richmond Duramed Futures Classic
2009: iMPACT Classic
2010: Greater Richmond Golf Classic
2011–13: Eagle Classic
2014: Eagle Classic Presented by Bag Boy

Winners

1Won in a sudden-death playoff

Tournament records

References

External links
Coverage on the Symetra Tour's official site

Former Symetra Tour events
Golf in Virginia